The 81st Airborne Commando Battalion was a unique special unit of the Vietnamese Rangers of the Republic of Vietnam Military Forces.

History

The Special Forces

It was originally formed as part of the Project DELTA reaction force. Formed on 1 November 1964 as the 91st Airborne Ranger Battalion and consisted of three companies of Montagnards. A fourth company was added in 1965. It was reorganized in 1966 as the 81st Ranger Battalion by the "purging of non-Vietnamese" to make it more "effective". The 81st consisted of six all-Vietnamese companies. Officially under Army of the Republic of Vietnam Special Forces (LLDB) command, not that of Ranger Command, the battalion was actually under the direct control of Project DELTA although two companies were made available to the LLDB. It was also used to reinforce SF camps under siege. During and after the Tet Offensive it also fought in Saigon and handled urban fighting conditions quite well.

The 81st Ranger Battalion was later expanded to seven companies and renamed the 81st Ranger Group which was facilitated by the merger of Delta Teams with the existing three Ranger Companies. The entire unit was parachute trained and was under the direct control of the ARVN Military intelligence (G-2).

In 1975 it was headquartered at Trang Lon, Tay Linh, and consisted of a Headquarters, seven Ranger and one Pathfinder company. Group strength varied from 920 to 1200 men.

The 91st/81st battalion continued to wear the old LLDB Green Beret instead of the Ranger Brown/Maroon Beret.

Fall of Tan Son Nhut Air Base
During the 1975 Ho Chi Minh Campaign, elements of the group were defending Tan Son Nhut Air Base.

The 3rd Task Force, 81st Ranger Group commanded by Major Pham Chau Tai defended Tan Son Nhut and they were joined by the remnants of the Loi Ho unit. At 07:15 on 30 April the PAVN 24th Regiment approached the Bay Hien intersection,  from the base's main gate. The lead T-54 was hit by M67 recoilless rifle fire, and then the next T-54 was hit by a shell from an M48 tank. The PAVN infantry moved forward and engaged the ARVN in house to house fighting forcing them to withdraw to the base by 08:45. The PAVN then sent three tanks and an infantry battalion to assault the main gate and they were met by intensive anti-tank and machine gun fire knocking out the 3 tanks and killing at least 20 PAVN soldiers. The PAVN tried to bring forward an 85mm antiaircraft gun but the ARVN knocked it out before it could start firing. The PAVN 10th Division ordered 8 more tanks and another infantry battalion to join the attack, but as they approached the Bay Hien intersection they were hit by an airstrike from RVNAF jets operating from Binh Thuy Air Base which destroyed two T-54s. The six surviving tanks arrived at the main gate at 10:00 and began their attack, with 2 being knocked out by antitank fire in front of the gate and another destroyed as it attempted a flanking manoeuvre.

At approximately 10:30 Maj. Pham heard of the surrender broadcast of President Dương Văn Minh and went to the ARVN Joint General Staff Compound to seek instructions. He called General Minh, who told him to prepare to surrender, Pham reportedly told Minh "If Viet Cong tanks are entering Independence Palace we will come down there to rescue you sir." Minh refused Pham's suggestion and Pham then told his men to withdraw from the base gates. At 11:30 the North Vietnamese entered the base.

Notes

References 
Gordon L. Rottman and Ron Volstad, US Army Special Forces 1952-84, Elite series 4, Osprey Publishing Ltd, London 1985. 
Gordon L. Rottman and Ron Volstad, Vietnam Airborne, Elite Series 29, Osprey Publishing Ltd, London 1990. 
Gordon L. Rottman and Ramiro Bujeiro, Army of the Republic of Vietnam 1955-75, Men-at-arms series 458, Osprey Publishing Ltd, Oxford 2010. 
Kenneth Conboy and Simon McCouaig, South-East Asian Special Forces, Elite series 33, Osprey Publishing Ltd, London 1991. 
Lee E. Russell and Mike Chappell, Armies of the Vietnam War 2, Men-at-arms series 143, Osprey Publishing Ltd, London 1983. .
Leroy Thompson, Michael Chappell, Malcolm McGregor and Ken MacSwan, Uniforms of the Indo-China and Vietnam Wars, Blandford Press, London 1984. ASIN: B001VO7QSI
Martin Windrow and Mike Chappell, The French Indochina War 1946-54, Men-at-arms series 322, Osprey Publishing Ltd, Oxford 1998. 
Phillip Katcher and Mike Chappell, Armies of the Vietnam War 1962-1975, Men-at-arms series 104, Osprey Publishing Ltd, London 1980. 
Jade Ngoc Quang Huynh, South Wind Changing, Graywolf Press, Minnesota 1994. ASIN: B01FIW8BJG
Mark Moyar, Triumph Forsaken: The Vietnam War, 1954-1965, Cambridge University Press, Cambridge, U.K. 2009. , 0521757630
Neil L. Jamieson, Understanding Vietnam, The Regents of the University of California press, Berkeley and Los Angeles, California 1995. ASIN: B00749ZBRC
Nguyen Cao Ky, How we lost the Vietnam War, Stein & Day Pub 1979. , 0812860160
Tran Van Don, Our Endless War: Inside Vietnam, Presidio Press, Novato, California 1978. , 0891410198

Military special forces battalions
Commando units and formations
Military units and formations of South Vietnam
Military units and formations disestablished in 1975